Han Do-hee (born 16 November 1994) is a South Korean ice hockey player. She competed in the 2018 Winter Olympics.

Awards and honors
Directorate Award, Best Goaltender: 2017 IIHF Women's World Championship Division II, Group A

References

1994 births
Living people
Ice hockey players at the 2018 Winter Olympics
South Korean women's ice hockey goaltenders
Olympic ice hockey players of South Korea
Ice hockey players at the 2011 Asian Winter Games
Ice hockey players at the 2017 Asian Winter Games